The Swanson River is a river in Sudbury District in northeastern Ontario, Canada. It is in the James Bay drainage basin, begins south of Mageau Lake and is a left tributary of the Chapleau River.

Course
The river begins in geographic Marshall Township, and flows north to Mageau Lake, where it enters geographic Mageau Township. It heads northeast into geographic Manning Township, continues northeast into geographic Floranna Township followed by geographic Sadler Township. It enters geographic Lipsett Township, takes in the right tributary Little Swanson River, heads east into geographic Copperfield Township, and reaches its mouth at Schewabik Lake on the Chapleau River. The Chapleau River flows via the Kapuskasing River, the Mattagami River and the Moose River to James Bay.

Tributaries
Little Swanson River (right)

References

Sources

Rivers of Sudbury District